Kangabam Tomba (born 10 June 1946) is an Indian actor from Imphal, Manipur. He started his career in theatre. His first appearance in movies is in Matamgi Manipur, the first Manipuri full-length feature film where he played a college guy. His is popularly known as Lamja Tomba for his titular role in the 1974 movie Lamja Parshuram. Tomba bagged the Best Actor Award at the 1st Manipur State Film Festival 1984 for the film. He was conferred with the Lifetime Achievement Award at  the 11th Manipur State Film Awards 2018.

Tomba was awarded the Neta Irawat Leelaroi Lifetime Mana (Manipuri Cinema) at the 1st MANIFA 2012 organised by Sahitya Seva Samiti, Kakching.

Early life and education
Kangabam Tomba is the youngest among his five siblings. He studied till VI standard in Kwakeithel Boys' School, Imphal. He completed his high school from Ram Lal Paul High School. He did his further studies from Imphal College.

Career
He first received the knowledge of theatre from his Manipuri teacher of Imphal College G.C. Tongbra, who was also a noted playwright. Tomba joined Society Theatre in 1967. Some of the famous plays where he had acted include Ani Thokna Chingkhaire, Julius Caesar, Hamlet, Mani Mamou and Ngabongkhao. Julius Caesar and Hamlet are Manipuri plays translated from their original versions of William Shakespeare by G.C. Tongbra.

He appeared as a college guy in Matamgi Manipur, the first Manipuri feature film in 1972. His first movie as a leading actor is Lamja Parshuram released in 1974, where he played the titular role. The movie became a hit and since then, he is popularly known as Lamja Tomba. His 1979 movie Olangthagee Wangmadasoo ran for 32 weeks, the longest Manipuri movie to run in theatres till date and broke the local box office records of Sholay. In Paokhum Ama, he played a government employee from Imphal who is posted to a hill district of Manipur. He was the leading male protagonist in 1990 Aribam Syam Sharma's movie Ishanou, which was critically acclaimed worldwide and participated in the prestigious Cannes Film Festival 1991.

He has also acted in digital films like Ashangba Nongjabi, Nangtana Helli, Amamba Lambee and Nongphadok Lakpa Atithi. Tomba is an approved radio artist of All India Radio, Imphal. Some of the well known radio plays where he was a part are Ashangba Nongjabi and Nongphadok Lakpada.

Filmography

References

External links
 

20th-century Indian male actors
Living people
People from Imphal
Indian male film actors
Meitei people
1946 births
Male actors from Manipur